Thekla Simona Gelsomina Reuten (born 16 September 1975) is a Dutch actress.

Life and career
Reuten was born in Bussum, Netherlands, the daughter of a Dutch father, Joost Reuten, and an Italian mother, who was born in Benabbio near Bagni di Lucca. She studied acting at the Amsterdamse Hogeschool voor de Kunsten in Amsterdam. During the last year of her studies, she assumed leading roles in Dutch film and theatre productions. Early in her career, she won the "Shooting Star Award" of the Berlinale (Berlin Film Festival) for her portrayal of Lotte in the film Twin Sisters, which was nominated for the Academy Award for Best Foreign Language Film. Subsequent roles included In Bruges with Colin Farrell, Hotel Lux with Bully Herbig, and The American alongside George Clooney, as well as the political thriller . Other films include De Trip van Teetje (Tate's Voyage), Kruimeltje (Little Crumb), Rosenstraße, Una Bellezza Che Non Lascia Scampo ("An Inescapable Beauty"), and Iedereen beroemd! (Everybody's Famous!), which was nominated for an Academy Award for Best Foreign Language Film.

Reuten's television work includes  Hidden (BBC, United Kingdom), Restless (BBC, United Kingdom), and Sleeper Cell (Showtime, USA). She has performed in Johan Simons' production Fall of the Gods at the Salzburg Festival and the Ruhr Triennial, as well as in Rufus Norris’ Blood Wedding at the Almeida Theatre in London, alongside Gael Garcia Bernal.

Reuten speaks five languages: German, English, French, Dutch, and Italian.

On 18 March 2019, it was announced that Reuten was cast as Jillian Salvius in the Netflix fantasy series, Warrior Nun.

Filmography

 1996: Verhalen uit de bijbel, ‘de man op de ezel''' (Director: Rein van Schagen)
 1997: Arends (Director: Jelle Nesna)
 1998: Baantjer, episode De Cock en de moord op de heks (Director: Pollo de Pimentel)
 1998: Tate's Voyage (Director: Paula van der Oest)
 1998: Het 14e kippetje (Director: Hany Abu-Assad)
 1998: Wij, Alexander (Director: Rimko Haanstra)
 1999: De rode zwaan (Director: Martin Lagestee)
 1999: Klokhuis (Director: Niek Barendsen and Barbera Bredero)
 1999: Kruimeltje (Director: Maria Peters)
 1999: Moët und Chandon (Director: Marc de Cloe)
 2000: Iedereen beroemd! (Director: Dominique Deruddere)
 2000: De zwarte Meteoor (Director: Guido Pieters)
 2001: Chalk (Director: Diederik van Rooijen)
 2001: De Acteurs (Director: Bram van Splunteren)
 2001: Una bellezza che non lascia scampo (Director: Francesca Pirani)
 2002: Bella Bettien (Director: Hans Pos)
 2002: Twin Sisters (De Tweeling) (Director: Ben Sombogaart)
 2002: Spagaat (Director: Hans Pos)
 2003: Brush with Fate (Director: Brent Shields)
 2003: Mijn zusje Zlata (Director: Roel Welling)
 2003: Parels & Zwijnen (Director: Diederik van Rooijen)
 2003: Rosenstraße (Rosenstrasse) (Director: Margarethe von Trotta)
 2004: Co/Ma (Director: Roel Welling)
 2004: De Band (Director: Albert Jan van Rees)
 2004: De duistere diamant  (Director: Rudi van den Bossche)
 2005: Not She - Film Installation (Director: Ine Lamers)
 2005: Smachten - Boy meets Girl Stories (Director: Mark de Cloe)
 2006: Boks, ‘De verdwenen Van Gogh’ (Director: Hans Pos)
 2006: Ober (Director: Alex van Warmerdam)
 2006: Sleeper Cell, II. Season (Director: Charles S. Dutton, Leslie Libman, Nick Gomez)
 2007: Highlander: The Source (Director: Brett Leonard)
 2008: In Bruges (Director: Martin McDonagh)
 2008: In Transit (Director: Tom Roberts)
 2008: Lost - IV. Season (Director: Jack Bender)
 2008: The Silent Army (Director: Jean van de Velde)
 2009:  (Director: Lancelot von Naso)
 2010: Day One (Director: Alex Graves)
 2010: The American (Director: Anton Corbijn)
 2011: Hotel Lux (Director: Leander Haußmann)
 2012: Hidden (Director: Niall MacCormick)
 2012: Restless (Director: Edward Hall)
 2013:	 (Director: Holger Haase)
 2013:	Speelmann (Director: Klaartje Quirijns)
 2013:	Het Diner (Director: Menno Meyjes)
 2015:	Atlantic. (Director: Jan-Willem van Ewijk)
 2015:	De Reünie (Director: Menno Meyjes)
 2015:	Home Suite Home (Director: Jeroen Houben) (short film)
 2015:	L’Angelo di Sarajevo (Director: Enzo Monteleone)
 2015:	Schone Handen  (Director: Tjebbo Penning)
 2015:	The Legend of Longwood (Director: Lisa Mulcahy)
 2017: Stan Lee's Lucky Man 2018: Red Sparrow 2020: Marionette (Director: Elbert van Strien)
 2020: Warrior Nun 2022: NarcosisTheater (selection)
 1997: Susn by Herbert Achternbusch as 'Suus' at Brakke Grond Atsterdat, Festival aan zee Oostende and Theater Kikker Utrecht (Director: Jeroen Wilems)
 1998: The Comedy of Seduction by Arthur Schnitzler as 'Gilda' at Het Nationale Toneel (Director: Ger Thijs)
 1999: The Dresser by Ronald Harwood as 'Irene' at Hummelinck Stuurman (Director: Tom Jansen)
 1999: Fall of the Gods by Luchino Visconti and Tom Blokdijk as 'Bediende', 'Lisa' and 'Dirndl' at Hollandia and zu den Salzburger Festspiele and zur Ruhr Triennale (Director: Johan Simons and Paul Koek)
 2001: The House of Bernarda Alba by Federico García Lorca as 'Adela' at Het Nationale Toneel (Director: Johan Doesburg)
 2004: Braatbos by Willem Jan Otten as 'Nana' at Het Toneel Speelt (Director: Willem van de Sande Bakhuyzen)
 2005: Blood Wedding by Federico García Lorca as 'Braut' at Almeida Theater (Director: Rufus Norris)

Voice-over (dubbing)
 2004: Shark Tale (Dutch Voice-Over of Angie) (Director: Kellie Allred)
 2007: Bee Movie (Dutch Voice-Over of Vanessa Bloome) (Director: Steve Hickner, Simon J. Smith)
 2014:	How to Train Your Dragon (Dutch Voice-Over ‘Valka’) (Director: Dean DeBlois)

Awards (selection)
1997: Encouragement Award at Belgian Theatre Festival 'Theater aan Zee' for Susn1997: Philip Morris Scholarship (Nomination) for Susn1998: Golden Calf Award (Nomination) for Best Actress in De Trip van het Teetje1998: NOS Culture Award (Nomination) for Best Actress 
2004: European Shooting Star of the Berlinale  for outstanding performance in Twin Sisters2009: Rembrandt Award (Nomination) for Best Actress  in The Silent Army''

References

External links
 
 
 
New York Times filmography of Thekla Reuten
Thekla Reuten at Virtual History

1975 births
Living people
People from Bussum
Dutch film actresses
Dutch television actresses
Dutch stage actresses
Dutch people of Italian descent
People of Tuscan descent
Golden Calf winners
20th-century Dutch actresses
21st-century Dutch actresses